Henry Cort (c. 1740 – 23 May 1800) was an English ironware producer although formerly a Navy pay agent. During the Industrial Revolution in England, Cort began refining iron from pig iron to wrought iron (or bar iron) using innovative production systems. In 1784, he patented an improved version of the puddling process for refining cast iron although its commercial viability was only accomplished by innovations introduced by the Merthyr Tydfil ironmasters Crawshay and Homfray.

Biography 
Little is known of Cort's early life other than that he was possibly born into a family coming from Lancaster, England although his parents are unknown. Although his date of birth is traditionally given as 1740, this can not be confirmed and his early life remains an enigma. 
By 1765, Cort had become a Royal Navy pay agent, acting on commission collecting half pay and widows' pensions from an office in Crutched Friars near Aldgate in London.   At that time, despite Abraham Darby's improvements in the smelting of iron using coke instead of charcoal as blast furnace fuel, the resultant product was still only convertible to bar iron by a laborious process of decarburization in finery forges.  As a result, bar iron imported from the Baltic undercut that produced in Britain, (increasingly from Russia) at considerable expense.

In 1768, Cort's second marriage was to Elizabeth Heysham, the daughter of a Romsey solicitor and steward of the Duke of Portland whose estates included Titchfield. whose uncle William Attwick although a successful London attorney had inherited the family ironmongery business in Gosport which supplied the navy with mooring chains, anchors and hundreds of different items of ironmongery.

Partnership with Samuel Jellicoe 
In 1780, the Royal Navy's Victualling Commissioners agreed with Cort, who had taken over Attwick's business, to re roll iron hoops for their barrels. This led to Cort investing in a new rolling mill at an existing iron mill in Titchfield which was later used for the production of bar iron. Short of funds, he turned to Adam Jellicoe, at that time chief clerk in the Pay Office of the Royal Navy, who agreed to finance Cort to the amount of nearly £58 000 on seemingly little security beyond the value of the business. It was the accepted practice for clerks in the Pay Office to temporarily use surplus funds for their own benefit.  As part of the arrangement, Jellicoe's son Samuel became a partner in the Fontley Works. The deal was later to have unfortunate repercussions for Cort

Rolling mill and puddling furnace 

Cort developed his ideas at the Fontley Works (as he had renamed Titchfield Hammer) resulting in a 1783 patent for a simple reverberatory furnace to refine pig iron followed by a 1784 patent for his puddling furnace, with grooved rollers which mechanised the formerly laborious process. His work built on the existing ideas of the Cranege brothers and their reverberatory furnace (where heat is applied from above, rather than through the use of forced air from below) and (particularly) Peter Onions' puddling process where iron is stirred to separate out impurities and extract the higher quality wrought iron. The furnace effectively lowered the carbon content of the cast iron charge through oxidation while the "puddler" extracted a mass of iron from the furnace using an iron "rabbling bar". The extracted ball of metal was then processed into a "shingle" by a shingling hammer, after which it was rolled in the rolling mill. The original process of Cort was ineffectual until significant alterations were made by Richard Crawshay and other Merthyr Tydfil ironmasters as Cort used iron from charcoal furnaces rather than the coke smelted pig iron in general production by then.

Death of Adam Jellicoe 
When Adam Jellicoe died suddenly on 30 August 1789, it became apparent that the £58 000 lent to Cort could not be repaid. As a result, the Crown seized all the Property of Adam Jellicoe as well as that of the partnership of Cort and Samuel Jellicoe. Cort was held responsible for Jellicoe's debt and declared bankrupt. The Crown later gave Samuel Jellicoe possession of the works at Fontley where he " remained ... undisturbed for long years afterward" and made no attempt to realize patent dues from ironmasters, as the system did not work with the grey iron produced in the Midlands and South Wales.

Patents and royalties 
The importance of Cort's improvements to the process of iron making were recognised as early as 1786 by Lord Sheffield who regarded them (undeservedly) along with James Watt's work on the steam engine as more important than the loss of America.
In 1787, Cort came to an agreement with South Wales ironmaster Richard Crawshay whereby all iron manufactured according to the former's patents would result in a royalty of 10 shillings per ton. Cort seems to have alienated most of those with whom he came in contact.

Personal life 
Cort's marriage to Elizabeth Heysham produced 13 children. His business ventures did not bring him wealth, even though vast numbers of the puddling furnaces that he developed were eventually used (reportedly 8,200 by 1820), they used a modified version of his process and thus avoided payment of royalties. He was later awarded a government pension, but died a ruined man, and was buried in the churchyard of St John-at-Hampstead, London.

Legacy 
Fifty years after Cort's death, The Times of London lauded him as "the father of the iron trade". His son, Richard Cort, became a cashier for the British Iron Company in 1825 – 6 and subsequently wrote several pamphlets severely critical of the management of the company. He also attacked a number of early railway companies.

The Henry Cort Community College bears his name and is located in the town of Fareham, in the south of Hampshire, England. The busway between Fareham and Bridgemary, built on the trackbed of the old Gosport to Fareham railway line, is entitled Henry Cort Way on maps.

Notes

References

Further reading 
 Dickinson, H. W. Henry Cort's Bicentenary, in The Newcomen Society, Transactions 1940–41, volume XXI, 1943.
 Mott, R. A. (ed. P. Singer), Henry Cort: the Great Finer, The Metals Society, London 1983)
 Webster, Thomas The Case of Henry Cort and his Inventions in the Manufacture of British Iron, Mechanics' Magazine, 1859

External links 
Henry Cort – brief biography
Henry Cort – another brief biography
The Gosport Iron Foundry and Henry Cort
Henry Cort, Father of the Iron Trade - the most reliable and up-to-date information on the British inventor

1740 births
1800 deaths
British ironmasters
18th-century British inventors
People from Lancaster, Lancashire
People of the Industrial Revolution